Agnieszka Kotlarska-Świątek (15 August 1972 – 27 August 1996) was a Polish fashion model and beauty queen.

Career
While studying at Wrocław University of Science and Technology, Agnieszka won the Miss Polski beauty pageant held at the Forest Opera in Sopot on 19 July 1991. On 13 October 1991, she became the first Polish winner of the Miss International beauty pageant held in Tokyo, Japan.

She went on to pursue a modelling career in the United States, represented by Ford Models in New York for the likes of Ralph Lauren and Calvin Klein. Around 1992, while working in New York, she married Jarosław Świątek, one of the organisers of the 1991 edition of Miss Polski. The couple later returned to their native Poland at the end of 1993 to settle in her hometown Wrocław.

Death
Kotlarska narrowly escaped death when at the last minute, she backed out of flying on TWA Flight 800, which crashed with no survivors off Long Island, New York on 17 July 1996. Rico Puhlmann, who was Kotlarska's chief photographer, was among the victims.

She was stabbed to death by a stalker on 27 August 1996. The attack also injured her husband, Jarosław Świątek. Her two-year-old daughter was a witness to the attack. She was laid to rest at Grabiszyński Cemetery (pl:Cmentarz Grabiszyński) on 30 August 1996. The assailant, computer programmer Jerzy Lisiewski, was subsequently sentenced to 15 years imprisonment, finishing his sentence in 2012. Lisiewski was later arrested for stabbing a Romanian man during an attempted burglary in the district of Psie Pole in 2014.

References

External links
Official Miss Polski website - Agnieszka Kotlarska Profile

1972 births
1996 deaths
Miss International winners
Polish beauty pageant winners
Polish murder victims
Deaths by stabbing in Poland
Miss International 1991 delegates